The Annobón paradise flycatcher (Terpsiphone smithii) is a medium-sized species of passerine bird in the family Monarchidae. It is endemic to Annobón Island in Equatorial Guinea.

Taxonomy and systematics
The Annobón paradise flycatcher was previously classified with the Old World flycatcher family Muscicapidae, but the paradise flycatchers, monarch flycatchers, and allies are now placed in a separate family, Monarchidae, which has most of its members in Australasia and tropical southern Asia. Within its genus, the Annobón paradise flycatcher was split from the red-bellied paradise flycatcher in 2009 by the IOC. Some other authorities continue to treat the Annobón paradise flycatcher as a subspecies of the red-bellied paradise flycatcher (T. rufiventer smithii).

Habitat
It is found in tropical forests.

References

Terpsiphone
Endemic birds of Annobón
Birds described in 1843